The Fair Jilt: or, the Amours of Prince Tarquin and Miranda is a short novella by Aphra Behn published in 1688.

Background

The story is dedicated to "Henry Pain, Esq.", also known as Henry Neville Payne, a Roman Catholic agitator who was later arrested and tortured for his involvement in the Montgomery Plot of 1689.

In The Fair Jilt, Behn claims that the story is true and that she witnessed much of it herself. Editor Montague Summers writes in his introduction to The Works of Aphra Behn (1915) that the story is only loosely based on actual events: "With all the nice skill of a born novelist she has so mingled fact and fancy, what did occur and what might have been, that any attempt to disentangle the twain would be idle indeed." There was in fact a Prince Francisco de Tarquini who attempted to murder his sister-in-law but was spared death in 1666 after the executioner's initial stroke failed to kill him. The London Gazette reported that the prince was only slightly wounded due to a mistake by the executioner, and was subsequently pardoned.

Plot

When the story opens, young Miranda is living in a convent of Begines, an order of "galloping nuns" who take only temporary vows. Her parents are dead and her younger sister, Alcidiana, lives with an uncle. The seeming unattainability of the Begines makes them more desirable to men, and Miranda is beautiful, accomplished, and wealthy. Not surprisingly, she has many admirers; she receives their gifts and attention with pleasure, while loving none of them. Then one day she meets Henrick, a handsome young prince who has taken monastic vows and changed his name to Francisco. (Miranda's maid tells her about Henrick's tragic past in a story within a story.) Miranda becomes infatuated with Henrick. When he rejects her advances, she accuses him of rape and has him thrown in prison.

Soon afterwards, Miranda meets Prince Tarquin and the two marry, but Miranda's extravagant lifestyle soon sees her wealth greatly reduced. She invites her sister to move in with her and Tarquin so that she can pilfer from her sister's funds. To keep a hold over her sister, she rebuffs all of her sister's suitors until Alcidiana moves out. Miranda then sends a servant to poison Alcidiana, which he does, but Alcidiana does not die and the servant reveals Miranda's plan to the authorities.  The servant is hanged, and Miranda, due to her position, is only shamed, though a great sum of money is owed to Alcidiana and Tarquin is ordered to pay it by the court.  Miranda talks Tarquin into killing her sister, and so he attempts to shoot her but fails. He is caught, confesses, and is sent to be beheaded, but the executioner misses the mark and hits Tarquin's shoulder instead, causing severe injury. Tarquin is then released, and he and Miranda leave the country. In the closing lines, it is noted that Miranda eventually repents her sinful past and that Tarquin has since died, though no explanation is offered for his death.

Critical reception

According to Maureen Duffy, The Fair Jilt damaged Behn's reputation unjustly. Many readers found the story so hard to believe that they assumed it was fabricated, despite her insistence that it was true.

Although a villainess, Behn's Miranda is not as repellent as the shockingly unhygienic Cornelia in The London Jilt. For this reason, Bonnie Blackwell credits The Fair Jilt, along with other works by female authors, with giving the word "jilt" a more positive connotation than it had in the past.

References

Further reading
 Flint, Christopher. "Family Romance to Domestic Scandal: 'Female Arts' in The Fair Jilt" Family Fictions: Narrative and Domestic Relations in Britain, 1688-1798. Stanford, Calif: Stanford University Press, 2000.  
 Goulding, Susan. 2008. "Aphra Behn's "Stories of Nuns": Narrative Diversion and "Sister Books". Interdisciplinary Literary Studies. 10, no. 1: 38-55.   
 Pearson, Jacquelin. "The Short Fiction (excluding Oroonoko)" Hughes, Derek, and Janet Todd. The Cambridge Companion to Aphra Behn188-203. Cambridge, UK: Cambridge University Press, 2004.  
 Rubik, Margarete. Aphra Behn and Her Female Successors. Wien [u.a.]: LIT-Verl, 2011.

External links
 Full text on Project Gutenberg
 The Fair Jilt - A Course Of Steady Reading

1688 short stories
Early Modern English literature
British short stories